Palaio Keramidi is a village and a community of the Katerini municipality. Before the 2011 local government reform it was part of the municipality of Elafina, of which it was also the seat. The 2011 census recorded 890 inhabitants in the village.

References

Populated places in Pieria (regional unit)